The 32nd Legislative Assembly of British Columbia sat from 1979 to 1983. The members were elected in the British Columbia general election held in May 1979. The Social Credit Party led by Bill Bennett formed the government. The New Democratic Party (NDP) led by Dave Barrett formed the official opposition.

Harvey Schroeder served as speaker for the assembly until August 1982 when he resigned as speaker. Kenneth Walter Davidson replaced Schroeder as speaker in September 1982.

Members of the 32nd General Assembly 
The following members were elected to the assembly in 1979:

Notes:

Party standings

By-elections 
By-elections were held to replace members for various reasons:

Notes:

References 

Political history of British Columbia
Terms of British Columbia Parliaments
1979 establishments in British Columbia
1983 disestablishments in British Columbia